Q with hook tail (majuscule: Ɋ, minuscule: ɋ) is a letter of the extended Latin alphabet. It was introduced by Lutheran missionaries in Papua New Guinea for use in the Numanggang language in the 1930s or 1940s. In 2002, it was decided to discontinue using Q with hook tail. It is still used in the Kâte language to represent a voiced labial-velar plosive .

In some forms of handwriting for English (and presumably other languages based on the Latin alphabet), lowercase q always has a hook tail. This is particularly evident in geometric sans-serif typefaces used to teach children how to write.

Unicode

References 

Qz